Anadasmus endochra is a moth of the family Depressariidae. It is found in Brazil (Amazonas).

The wingspan is about 25 mm. The forewings are fuscous with the basal third brownish-ochreous, the edge curved and rather irregular. There is a suffused pale brownish-ochreous dot on the end of the cell. The hindwings are dark grey.

References

Moths described in 1925
Anadasmus
Moths of South America